John Hancock Klippart (1823–1878) was an American agriculturist and expert on wheat farming.

Biography
Klippart was born in Canton, Ohio on July 26, 1823. Klippart worked for the Ohio State Board of Agriculture and has been described as the most "informed individual" of his time on wheat culture. He published a large book in 1858 documenting information about wheat plants and farming.

Klippart was an early evolutionary thinker to have mentioned the concept of natural selection. According to science historian Conway Zirkle "In 1858, Klippart showed how nature could displace one variety or species of wheat by another."

He died at his home in Columbus, Ohio on October 24, 1878.

Publications
 An Essay on the Origin, Growth, Diseases, Varieties, etc., of the Wheat Plant (1858)
 [https://archive.org/stream/wheatplantitsori00klip#page/n5/mode/2up The Wheat Plant: Its Origin, Culture, Growth, Development, Composition, Varieties, Diseases, Etc., Etc. Together With a Few Remarks on Indian Corn, its Culture, Etc.] (1860)
 The Principles and Practice of Land Drainage (1861)

References

1823 births
1878 deaths
American agriculturalists
Proto-evolutionary biologists